Jonathan T. Capehart (born July 2, 1967) is an American journalist and television commentator. He writes for The Washington Post's PostPartisan blog and is host of The Saturday/Sunday Show with Jonathan Capehart on MSNBC.

Background
Capehart grew up in Hazlet, New Jersey, and Newark, New Jersey, and attended Saint Benedict's Preparatory School. He received a BA in political science from Carleton College.

Career

Before his work with The Washington Post and MSNBC, Capehart was a researcher for NBC's The Today Show. He worked for the New York Daily News, serving as a member of its editorial board from 1993 to 2000. At the time of his hiring, Capehart was the youngest-ever member of the newspaper's editorial board. He left the Daily News in 2000 to work at Bloomberg News. Capehart advised and wrote speeches for Michael Bloomberg during his 2001 run for New York City mayor. He returned to the New York Daily News in 2002, serving as deputy editor of the editorial page until 2004. Capehart joined the global public relations company Hill & Knowlton in December 2004 as a Senior Vice President and senior counselor of public affairs.

Capehart joined the staff of  The Washington Post as a journalist and member of its editorial board in 2007. He continues in that capacity and is a contributing commentator for MSNBC. He also hosts the Cape Up podcast, in which he talks to newsmakers about race, religion, age, gender, and cultural identity in politics.

Capehart began guest hosting the WNYC radio show Midday on WNYC (formerly The Leonard Lopate Show) in 2018.

He hosted the premiere episode of The Sunday Show with Jonathan Capehart on MSNBC on December 13, 2020. He is also the fill-in host of The Last Word with Lawrence O'Donnell on Friday edition.

Capehart replaced Mark Shields in the Friday political commentary segment on the PBS NewsHour starting in January 2021. 
On March 30, 2022 Capehart became the associate editor of The Washington Post

In February 2023, Capehart's The Sunday Show was expanded to Saturday as well, becoming The Saturday/Sunday Show with Jonathan Capehart, beginning on February 18, 2023.

Awards and honors 
Capehart was a key contributor to a New York Daily News staff entry that received the Pulitzer Prize for Editorial Writing in 1999. The series of editorials condemned the financial mismanagement of Harlem's Apollo Theater.

He was a 2011 Esteem Honoree, a distinction given to individuals in recognition of efforts in supporting the African American and LGBT communities in the areas of entertainment, media, civil rights, business, and art.

In June 2020, in honor of the 50th anniversary of the first LGBTQ Pride parade, Queerty named him among the fifty heroes "leading the nation toward equality, acceptance, and dignity for all people".

Views
Capehart has analyzed how, in concurrence with the work of Jonathan Metzl, white identity affects state-based policy making in the US, such as gun rights in Missouri and health care in Tennessee.

Personal life
In May 2016, Capehart became engaged to his boyfriend of over five years, Nick Schmit, who was the assistant chief of protocol at the State Department. Capehart and Schmit were married by former U.S. attorney general Eric Holder on January 7, 2017.

References

External links

1967 births
Living people
African-American journalists
American bloggers
Carleton College alumni
New York Daily News people
American LGBT writers
LGBT African Americans
MSNBC people
Writers from Newark, New Jersey
The Washington Post journalists
LGBT people from New Jersey
St. Benedict's Preparatory School alumni
21st-century American non-fiction writers
American male bloggers
PBS people
American LGBT broadcasters